Lilith Fair was a concert tour and travelling music festival, founded by Canadian musician Sarah McLachlan, Nettwerk Music Group's Dan Fraser and Terry McBride, and New York talent agent Marty Diamond. It took place during the summers of 1997 to 1999, and was revived in the summer of 2010. It consisted solely of female solo artists and female-led bands. In its initial three years, Lilith Fair raised over $10 million for charity.

History
In 1996, Canadian musical artist Sarah McLachlan became frustrated with concert promoters and radio stations that refused to feature two female musicians in a row. Bucking conventional industry wisdom, she booked a successful tour for herself and Paula Cole. At least one of their appearances together—in Vancouver, on September 14, 1996—went by the name "Lilith Fair" and included performances by McLachlan, Cole, Lisa Loeb, and Michelle McAdorey, formerly of Crash Vegas.

The next year, McLachlan founded the Lilith Fair tour, taking Lilith from the Jewish lore that Lilith was Adam's first wife who refused to be subservient to him.

In 1997, Lilith Fair garnered a $16 million gross, making it the top-grossing of any touring festival. Among all concert tours for that year, it was the 16th-highest grossing. McLachlan followed this success with two more rounds, in 1998 and 1999.

In 2010, Lilith Fair staged a revival with mixed results, as several dates were cancelled and many performers backed out of scheduled performances.

In March 2011, McLachlan declared that the Lilith concept was no longer being considered for future shows, due to changing audience views and expectations.

Performers

1997
The artists appearing at Lilith Fair varied by date (with McLachlan and Suzanne Vega the only artists to play all dates). Appearances were organized into three stages. Almost all Village Stage artists performed only one or two dates. Many of them won slots on the bill in a series of local talent searches in their home cities.

Main stage artists
Fiona Apple
Tracy Bonham
Meredith Brooks
The Cardigans
Mary Chapin Carpenter
Tracy Chapman
Paula Cole
Shawn Colvin
Sheryl Crow
Indigo Girls
Emmylou Harris
Jewel
Lisa Loeb
Sarah McLachlan
Joan Osborne
Suzanne Vega

Second stage artists
Leah Andreone
Autour de Lucie
Mary Black
Holly Cole
Patty Griffin
Juliana Hatfield
Susanna Hoffs
Katell Keineg
Mary Jane Lamond
Yungchen Lhamo
Lhasa de Sela
Tara MacLean
Dayna Manning
Abra Moore
Mudgirl
Once Blue
Madeleine Peyroux
September '67
Wild Colonials
Wild Strawberries
Dar Williams
Victoria Williams
Kelly Willis
Cassandra Wilson

Village Stage artists
Fleming and John
Dido
Pat Benatar
Kinnie Starr
Lauren Hoffman
Kim Fox
Garrison Starr
Lori Carson
Joy Askew
Jill Sobule
Alana Davis
Beth Orton
Michelle Malone
Holly McNarland
Elise Knoll
Lovechild
Dayna Manning
Catherine Kidd
Oh Suzanna
Camille
Alisha's Attic
Gena and Sum Girl
Marley & Lizann
Sensual World
Jenny Labow
Suz Andreasen
Davina
Morcheeba
K's Choice

Dates
December 16
United States

West Palm Beach

1998
The artists appearing at Lilith Fair varied by date (with McLachlan the only artist to play all dates). Appearances were organized into three stages. Though Neneh Cherry and Lauryn Hill were scheduled to play some shows, both had to cancel. Almost all Village Stage artists performed only one or two dates. Many of them won slots on the bill in a series of local talent searches in their home cities.

Main stage artists
Sarah McLachlan
Bonnie Raitt
Chantal Kreviazuk
Cowboy Junkies
Des'ree
Diana Krall
Emmylou Harris
Erykah Badu
Indigo Girls
Joan Osborne
Lisa Loeb
Liz Phair
Luscious Jackson
Mary Chapin Carpenter
Meredith Brooks
Meshell Ndegeocello
Missy Elliott
Natalie Merchant
Paula Cole
Queen Latifah
Shawn Colvin
Sheryl Crow
Sinéad O'Connor
Suzanne Vega
Tracy Bonham

Second stage artists
K's Choice
Mono
Sister 7
Heather Nova
Morcheeba
Rebekah
Lucinda Williams
Victoria Williams
Abra Moore
Neneh Cherry
Elise Knoll
Mary Lou Lord
The Tuesdays
Billie Myers
N'Dea Davenport
Martina McBride
Litany
Paris Hampton
Davina
Beth Orton
Holly Cole
Diana King
Chantal Kreviazuk
Eden aka
Wild Strawberries
Patty Griffin
Lhasa de Sela
Angélique Kidjo
Imani Coppola
Lucy Gamelon
Kacy Crowley
Holly McNarland
Ebba Forsberg
Catie Curtis
Letters to Cleo
Neko Case
Fisher

Village Stage artists
Tara MacLean
Sinéad Lohan
Autour de Lucie
Ana Gasteyer
Garrison Starr
Emm Gryner
Anggun
Kacy Crowley
Bic Runga
Melanie Doane
Abra Moore
Joaelle Ndine Romero
Tia Texada
Jenny Bird
Sherri Jackson
1/2 Mad Poet
Mono
Thornetta Davis
Julie Kryk
Lori Amey
Fontaine
Donna Martin
Abba Rage
Deni Bonet
Jabber
Victoria Hogg
Eden White
Antigone Rising
Paris Hampton
Nancy Falkow
Dead Girls and Other
Love Riot
Trish Murphy
The Nields
Glassoline
Roadie Ray
INHOUSE
Audra Jost
Clandestine
Gordian Knot
Cling
Frankly Scarlet
Sixpence None the Richer
Robyn Ragland
Rose Polenzani
Alexis Antes
Amy Rigby
Erin Echo
Syd Straw
Laurie Geltman
Melissa Ferrick
Lenni Jabour
Ali Eisner
Swamperella
Alison Pipitone
Nina Storey
Julianne Blue
Idina Menzel
Noëlle Hampton
Arone Dyer
India Arie

Dates

1999
The artists appearing at Lilith Fair varied by date (with McLachlan the only artist to play all dates). Appearances were organized into three stages.

Main stage artists
Sandra Bernhard
Shawn Colvin
Deborah Cox
Sheryl Crow
Dixie Chicks
Indigo Girls
Queen Latifah
Lisa Loeb
Luscious Jackson
Martina McBride
Sarah McLachlan
Monica
Mýa
Meshell Ndegeocello
Liz Phair
The Pretenders
Joanelle Romero
Disappear Fear
Suzanne Vega

Second stage artists
Battershell
Cibo Matto
Kacy Crowley
Dance Hall Crashers
Dido
Melanie Doane
Patty Griffin
Emm Gryner
The Innocence Mission
Joan Jones
Elise Knoll Band
Jennifer Knapp
K's Choice
Sinéad Lohan
Tara MacLean
Aimee Mann
Melky Sedeck
Mediæval Bæbes
Morley
Trish Murphy
Bif Naked
Beth Orton
Kendall Payne
Bijou Phillips
Samsara
Sixpence None the Richer
Splashdown
Susan Tedeschi
Wild Strawberries
Victoria Williams
Kelly Willis

Village Stage artists
Christina Aguilera
Coco Love Alcorn
Badi Assad
Bertine Zetlitz
Toni Blackman
Diana Braithwaite
Cowlily
Kacy Crowley
E.G. Daily
Keren DeBerg
Anne E. DeChant
Jennie DeVoe
Eden AKA
Ana Egge
Essence
Nancy Falkow
Amy Fairchild
Fleming and John
Nelly Furtado
Fuzzy Comets
Glassoline
Grace in Gravity
Greta Gaines
Kitty Gordon
Nina Gordon
Kay Hanley
Kristin Hersh
Noella Hutton
Jarah Jane
Brenda Kahn
Jennifer Kimball
Nikol Kollars
Nicol Lischka
Ginger Mackenzie
The Marty Winkler Group
Melissa Mathes
Lori McKenna
Tiffany Shea
The Murmurs
Leona Naess
Juliana Nash
Kari Newhouse
Leslie Nuchow
Maren Ord
Ginny Owens
Deborah Pardes
Adrienne Pierce
Melissa Reaves
Renann
Doria Roberts
Loni Rose
Rachael Sage
Tegan and Sara
Summer Sage
Lisa Sanders
Stephanie Schneiderman
Bree Sharp
She-Haw
Shelley Doty X-Tet
Alexandra Sleightholm
Soul Miner's Daughter
Sozzi
Surrender Dorothy
Kinnie Starr
Melanie Susuras
Kashi Tara
Tekla
Too Cynical to Cry
Deborah Vial
Victoria White
Wendy Woo
Zoebliss
Xolie Morra & The Strange Kind

Dates and venues

2010 revival

In an April 25, 2009, Twitter post, Nettwerk founder Terry McBride announced that a Lilith Fair tour through North America would be relaunched for the summer of  2010, with a two-week tour of Europe to follow.

The tour was plagued with financial problems from the beginning. The first seven shows were sparsely attended and the eighth show was the first to be cancelled. Initially, Sarah McLachlan claimed (in an interview posted on the Arizona Republic website on July 9) that the July 8 Phoenix show was cancelled in protest of Arizona Senate Bill 1070, which she strongly opposes.

The tour fell apart on the road as headliners Carly Simon, Norah Jones, Kelly Clarkson, the Go-Go's, and Queen Latifah dropped out, fearing that they would not be paid for their performances.

Due to poor ticket sales, thirteen shows (about one-third of the tour) were scratched (two announced on June 25, ten more on July 1, one additional on July 2) and one reassigned to a smaller venue.

The artists appearing at Lilith Fair vary by date (with McLachlan the only artist to play all dates).  Appearances are organized into three stages. Below is a list of artists who performed at Lilith Fair in the 2010 revival.

Main stage artists
Ann McNamee / Ann Atomic
Anya Marina
The Bangles
Beth Orton
Brandi Carlile
Cat Power
Chantal Kreviazuk
Colbie Caillat
Court Yard Hounds
Emmylou Harris
Erykah Badu
A Fine Frenzy
Gossip
Heart
Indigo Girls
Ingrid Michaelson
Janelle Monáe
Jenni Rivera
Lights
Mary J. Blige
Metric
Miranda Lambert
Missy Higgins
Rosie Thomas
Sara Bareilles
Sarah McLachlan
Serena Ryder
Sheryl Crow
Sugarland
Suzanne Vega
Tegan and Sara

Second stage artists
Anjulie
Ash Koley
Donna De Lory
Erin McCarley
Jasmine Chadwick
Jennifer Knapp
Kate Miller-Heidke
Kate Nash
Kina Grannis
Marina and the Diamonds
Nikki Jean
Nneka
The Submarines
Susan Justice
Vedera
Vita Chambers
The Weepies

Village Stage artists
Xolie Morra & The Strange Kind
Sierra Noble
Airplanes
Amanda Lucas & Audrey Cecil
Bella Ruse
Butterfly Boucher
Cara Salimando
Corrin Campbell
Darrelle London
Elizaveta
Jes Hudak
Jesca Hoop
Jetty Rae
Joy Ike
Jill Hennessy
Julia Othmer
Kate Tucker
Katie Todd
Kitten
Lissie
Lucy Schwartz
Marié Digby
Meagan Smith
Melissa McClelland
Molly Jenson
Sara Swanson
Steph Macpherson
Tara MacLean
Terra Naomi
Winterbloom (Antje Duvekot, Anne Heaton, Meg Hutchinson, Rose Polenzani, Natalia Zukerman)
Zee Avi

Dates

Cancelled dates and venues

See also

 Moondance International Film Festival

References

External links
External Connections Paula Cole interview
Sarah McLachlan Official Lilith Fair website Archived June 12, 2010.

Rock festivals in Canada
Music festivals in the United States
Music festivals established in 1997
Feminist art organizations
1997 concert tours
1998 concert tours
1999 concert tours
2010 concert tours
Women in music
1997 establishments in Canada
1999 disestablishments in Canada
Sarah McLachlan
Feminist organizations in Canada